Deorhi before known as Husainpur is a village in Zamania tehsil of Ghazipur Dsitrict, Uttar Pradesh, India.

References

Villages in Ghazipur district